Akeem Garnet Roach (born 9 December 1995) is a Trinidadian international footballer who plays for Real Sociedad, as a striker.

Career
Roach has played club football for Defence Force, Club Sando, Vida, Mosta, and Real Sociedad.

He made his international debut for Trinidad and Tobago in 2016.

References

1995 births
Living people
Trinidad and Tobago footballers
Trinidad and Tobago expatriate footballers
Trinidad and Tobago international footballers
Liga Nacional de Fútbol Profesional de Honduras players
TT Pro League players
Maltese Premier League players
Defence Force F.C. players
Club Sando F.C. players
C.D.S. Vida players
Mosta F.C. players
C.D. Real Sociedad players
Association football forwards
Trinidad and Tobago expatriate sportspeople in Honduras
Trinidad and Tobago expatriate sportspeople in Malta
Expatriate footballers in Honduras
Expatriate footballers in Malta